Isabel's a Jezebel is a British musical with music by Galt MacDermot and book and lyrics by William Dumaresq, based loosely on one of the Grimm's Fairy Tales, centers around Isabel and her deep-sea lover, who spend their time copulating and arguing about bringing children into a world committed to death. 

After out-of-town tryouts, the musical premiered on 15 December 1970 on the West End at the Duchess Theatre, running for only 61 performances.  The cast included Frank Aiello, Sharon Campbell, Helen Chappelle, Peter Farrell, Carole Hayman, Michele Mowbray, Maria Popkiewitz, Miguel Sergides, Howard Wakeling.  The production was co-directed by Michael Wearing and Julie Arenal, who also choreographed.

After his spectacular success with the musical Hair, expectations for MacDermot's next work, Isabel's a Jezebel, were high.  The musical underwent several last minute cast changes, including Hayman's joining the show just before opening night.  The New York Times praised the score but called the book "irretrievably inert." 

A cast album was released in 1972 (Item 377673) Kilmarnock.

Musical numbers
More Than Earth, More Than Air
Down by the Ocean
Oh Fish in the Sea
On Sand by the Sea
Isabel's a Jezebel  
In Another Life/Nothing
Sand  
Oh Mummy Darling
God, It Matters Now
The Saddest Moon
Mama Don't Want No Baby
These Are the Things
Stanley Irritability
Use My Name
The Moon Should Be Rising Soon/The Weeds In the Wind
My God When I Think
Hah  
Love Knows No Season
So Ends Our Night

References

External links
Information from CastalbumDB.com

1970 musicals
West End musicals
Musicals based on secular traditions
Rock musicals
Musicals by Galt MacDermot